Girard, Alabama was a city in the far north-east corner of Russell County, Alabama across the Chattahoochee River from Columbus, Georgia.

Named after the Philadelphia-based banker and philanthropist Stephen Girard, who had purchased much of the Muscogee territory that would become Russell County, the town of Girard served as the county's first seat from 1832 to 1839. It was incorporated around 1833.

In 1923 Girard merged with Phenix City, Alabama. In 1933, the boundary of Russell County was moved north to take in all of Phenix City that had previously been in Lee County.

Albert C. Baker, who was the only person to serve on the Arizona Territorial Supreme Court and the Arizona Supreme Court, was from Girard.

Demographics

Girard first appeared on the 1850 U.S. Census as an incorporated community of 748 residents. Oddly, despite being a large center of population for the time, exceeding an estimated 1,000 residents after 1860, it was not separately returned on the census again until 1900 when it had nearly 4,000 residents.

For reference purposes, the population of the Girard Beat/Precinct, which included the town between 1870 and 1900 was as follows: 1870=3,984; 1880=4,637; 1890=5,486; 1900=6,440.

It formally ceased to exist in 1923 with its merger with neighboring Phenix City.

Notes

Ghost towns in Alabama
Geography of Russell County, Alabama